The Circuito de playas de la Costa Verde, also simply the Costa Verde, is a highway located along the coast of Callao and Lima, Peru. It unites the districts of La Punta, La Perla, San Miguel, Magdalena del Mar, San Isidro, Miraflores, Barranco and Chorrillos.

History
The land where the road is currently located was originally the location of large cliffs with no road access. Before the construction of the highway, some roads and balnearios had preceded the project under the government of Augusto B. Leguía.

The land was reclaimed to make way for the project using land dug up from the construction of the Paseo de la República, an idea by then mayor of Miraflores . The Costa Verde project began and ended in the 1970s, with its name coming from a part of the plan that included adding vegetation to the then bare cliffs.

During the 2007 Peru earthquake, the highway was damaged and temporarily closed.

The  was inaugurated in 2019 to be used in the Pan American Games, as well as the Parapan American Games.

See also
Vía Expresa Luis Fernán Bedoya Reyes

References

Highways in Peru